Buergeria is a genus of frogs in the family Rhacophoridae, and the sole genus of subfamily Buergeriinae. They are the sister taxon for all the other rhacophorids (subfamily Rhacophorinae). This position is firmly supported by the available evidence.

Buergeria are sometimes known as Buerger's frogs. There are four species found in an area that stretches from Hainan (China) and Taiwan through the Ryukyu Islands to Honshu (Japan).

Description
Buergeria are medium-sized to large frogs (snout-vent length ) that resemble in their body form Rana (unlike other rhacophorids). Their skin is smooth and they have no dorsal ornamentations. Their feet are fully webbed whereas their fingers are only up to half-webbed. They produce many eggs that are deposited in water and develop through a tadpole stage.

Species
There are six recognized species in the genus Buergeria:
 Buergeria buergeri (Temminck & Schlegel, 1838) — Kajika Frog
 Buergeria choui Matsui & Tominaga, 2020
 Buergeria japonica (Hallowell, 1861) — Ryukyu Kajika Frog
 Buergeria otai Wang, Hsiao, Lee, Tseng, Lin, Komaki & Lin, 2018
 Buergeria oxycephala (Boulenger, 1900)
 Buergeria robusta (Boulenger, 1909)

Conservation
The International Union for Conservation of Nature (IUCN) has assessed one of the four species as being vulnerable (Buergeria oxycephala), while the remaining ones are considered being of least concern.

References

 
Amphibian genera
Frogs of Asia
Taxa named by Johann Jakob von Tschudi
Taxonomy articles created by Polbot